Kirill Leonovich (born 21 April 1998) is a Belarusian professional footballer who plays for Isloch Minsk Raion.

References

External links 
 
 

1998 births
Living people
People from Zhodzina
Sportspeople from Minsk Region
Belarusian footballers
Association football midfielders
FC Dinamo Minsk players
FC Oshmyany players
FC Smolevichi players
FC Lida players
FC Torpedo-BelAZ Zhodino players
FC Smorgon players
FC Neman Grodno players
FC Isloch Minsk Raion players